Dabethuwa is a village in Varanasi tehsil of Varanasi district in the Indian state of Uttar Pradesh. It is about 294 kilometres from the state capital Lucknow and 776 kilometres from the national capital Delhi.

Demography
Dabethuwa has a total population of 757 people amongst 106 families. Sex ratio of Dabethuwa is 897 and child sex ratio is 1,034. Uttar Pradesh state average for both ratios is 912 and 902 respectively.

Transportation
Dabethuwa can be accessed by road only as it does not have a railway station. Closest railway station to this village is Bhadohi (23 km).  Nearest operational airports are Varanasi airport (38 kilometres) and Allahabad Airports (114 kilometres).

See also

Notes

  All demographic data is based on 2011 Census of India.

References 

Villages in Varanasi district